Frankfort Township is one of 24 townships in Will County, Illinois. As of the 2010 census, its population was 57,055 and it contained 19,720 housing units.

Geography
It includes almost all of Frankfort and Mokena as well as small portions of Tinley Park and Orland Park.

Boundaries
Frankfort Township is bordered by Harlem Avenue (Illinois Route 43) on the east (where Cook County and Will County share a border), 183rd Street and Orland Parkway on the north (which is also the Cook-Will county border), Townline Road on the west, and Steger Road on the south.

Cities, towns, villages
 Frankfort (vast majority)
 Mokena (vast majority)
 Tinley Park (small portion)
 Orland Park (small portion)

Other Communities
 Arbury Hills at 
 Frankfort Square

Adjacent townships
 Orland Township, Cook County (north)
 Bremen Township, Cook County (northeast)
 Rich Township, Cook County (east)
 Monee Township (southeast)
 Green Garden Township (south)
 Manhattan Township (southwest)
 New Lenox Township (west)
 Homer Township (northwest)

Cemeteries
The township contains these eight cemeteries: Frankfort Township, Frankfort, Pioneer Memorial, Pleasant Hill, Saint John's United Church of Christ, Saint Mary's, Stellwagen, and Union Burial Society.

Major highways
  U.S. Route 30
  U.S. Route 45
  Interstate 80

Lakes
 Gun Club Lake

Landmarks
 Hunters Woods County Forest Preserve
 Hickory Creek Preserve (east three-quarters)

Demographics

Political districts
 Illinois's 1st congressional district
 State House District 37
 State House District 38
 State House District 80
 State Senate District 19
 State Senate District 40

References

External links
 Frankfort Township official website
 City-data.com
 Illinois State Archives
 Township Officials of Illinois
 Will County official site

Townships in Will County, Illinois
Townships in Illinois
1849 establishments in Illinois